Oregon Route 339 (OR 339) is an Oregon state highway running from the Washington state line near  Ferndale to Milton-Freewater. OR 339 is known as the Freewater Highway No. 339 (see Oregon highways and routes).

OR 339 was established in 2003 as part of Oregon's project to assign route numbers to highways that previously were not assigned.

Route description 

OR 339 begins at an intersection with State Line Road approximately one and one half miles north of Ferndale, at the Washington state line, and heads south through Ferndale and Sunnyside.  Approximately one-half-mile south of Sunnyside, OR 339 intersects OR 332.  OR 339 ends at the Milton-Freewater northern city limit.

History 

OR 339 was assigned to the Freewater Highway in 2003.

Major intersections

References 

 Oregon Department of Transportation, Descriptions of US and Oregon Routes, https://web.archive.org/web/20051102084300/http://www.oregon.gov/ODOT/HWY/TRAFFIC/TEOS_Publications/PDF/Descriptions_of_US_and_Oregon_Routes.pdf, page 30.

335
Transportation in Umatilla County, Oregon